The Palacio de las Garzas (Herons' Palace) is the governmental office and residence of the President of Panama. It receives its name because of herons roaming freely in the courtyard. The herons were first brought to the building in 1922, by the former president Belisario Porras Barahona, at the suggestion of friend and famed Panamanian poet Ricardo Miró.

History
The building is located in Casco Viejo, the old quarter of Panama City, which was built after the first settlement was destroyed just prior and during the sacking by pirate Henry Morgan. It was built in 1673 and has undergone many changes through the years. Initially, it was used as a home for the Spanish governor, as a royal winery, as a warehouse, and as both customs and National Bank's headquarters.

The new presidential house replaced the old customs offices on January 19, 1885. The remodeling works included the addition of a new room for official events in the upper level, along with other rooms to be used by the president and his family members. A Colombian artist, Epifanio Garay, was in charged of painting the portraits of all presidents since 1855.

The current Palacio de las Garzas was officially inaugurated on August 3, 1923. However, it was not until 1938 that it was acquired totally when the National Bank moved to its new headquarters located at Central Avenue. This transaction was in process since 1936 through an exchange with the Panamanian State.

Extensive renovations to the building were done around 1922, under the supervision of architect Leonardo Villanueva-Meyer. Works included the Andalusian courtyard, the addition of a third floor and two towers.

An elevator was added in 1934 for a State visit by US President Franklin D. Roosevelt so that he could access the chambers where he was to stay.

The building has served as the main office and official residence for all Panamanian presidents though some of them, such as Laurentino Cortizo, the current president, Juan Carlos Varela, Ricardo Martinelli, Martín Torrijos, Mireya Moscoso, Ernesto Pérez Balladares, have chosen to keep their residences elsewhere in the city and commute to the palace.

Rooms
The Salón Amarillo (Yellow Room) is the most important room, where most formal events are held. The Salón de los Tamarindos (Tamarind's Room) is the presidential dining room and receives its name from its murals, where the Panamanian painter Roberto Lewis inspired his ideas on Taboga Island and its famous tamarind trees. This work was asked in 1938 by Juan Demóstenes Arosemena, the president of that period. The Salón Morisco (Moorish Room) was added during the 1922 renovations by Villanueva-Meyer.

References

Residential buildings in Panama City
Presidential residences
Tourist attractions in Panama City